Figueira is a small village in the parish (freguesias) of Sobreira Formosa (municipality of Proença-a-Nova) in interior Portugal.

Villages in Portugal

pt:Figueira